Bay Le Moine (or La Moine Bay) is a natural bay on the island of Newfoundland in the province of Newfoundland and Labrador, Canada.

References

Bays of Newfoundland and Labrador